Superfrank! is a 1987 one-hour television special starring English comedian Frankie Howerd OBE.  The special show marked his return to television performance after an absence of five years.

The show was made by Channel 4 and HTV.  The script was written by Miles Tredinnick, Vince Powell and Andrew Nickolds and recorded before a live audience at the Playhouse Theatre in Weston-super-Mare close to where Howerd had his country home in the Mendips.  At one stage he is joined by some donkeys who do their best to upstage him. Howerd ends the show with some songs accompanied on the piano by Sunny Rogers. The show was produced by Cecil Korer and Derek Clark.  It was transmitted in January 1987.

The show's working title was 'Let's Be Frank!'

DVD release
Superfrank! is available on DVD as part of the two-disc Network DVD release Oh, Please Yourselves - Frankie Howerd at ITV.

References

External links
Frankie on the telly
screenonline: Superfrank! show credits
British Film Institute (BFI)

Channel 4 comedy
Channel 4 original programming
1987 television specials